Events from the year 1771 in art.

Events
 Limoges porcelain manufacture established in France.

Works
 Cristóbal de Aguilar – Manuel de Amat y Junient as Protector of the Monastery of the Nazarene
 Jean-Baptiste-Siméon Chardin – Self-portrait in spectacles (pastel)
 Louis-Bernard Coclers – Interior of a Foundry
 John Singleton Copley
Daniel Crommelin Verplanck (Metropolitan Museum of Art, New York)
Ezekiel Goldthwait and Mrs. Ezekiel Goldthwait (Elizabeth Lewis) (Museum of Fine Arts, Boston)
 Jacques-Louis David – Minerva Fighting Mars (Combat de Mars contre Minerve)
 Anton Graff
Gotthold Ephraim Lessing
Moses Mendelssohn
Jean-Antoine Houdon – Portrait bust of Diderot
John Hamilton Mortimer – Combined portrait of Dr Daniel Solander, Sir Joseph Banks, Captain James Cook, Dr John Hawkesworth and John Montagu, 4th Earl of Sandwich
 Alexander Roslin – King Gustav III of Sweden and his Brothers
 Claude Joseph Vernet – Clair de lune ("moonlight")
 Francis Wheatley – Scene from Twelfth Night
 Joseph Wright of Derby
The Alchymist, in Search of the Philosopher’s Stone, Discovers Phosphorus, and prays for the successful conclusion of his operation, as was the custom of the Ancient Chymical Astrologers (original version)
 The Blacksmith's Shop (two versions)

Births
 March 16 – Antoine-Jean Gros, French painter (died 1835)
 April 13 – Jakob Wilhelm Roux, German draughtsman and painter (died 1830)
 May 2 – John Henning, Scottish sculptor and medallist (died 1851)
 May 14 – Thomas Wedgwood, pioneer photographer (died 1805)
 November 6 
 Alois Senefelder, inventor of lithography (died 1834)
 Jovan Pačić, Serbian painter and poet (died 1849)
 November 20 – Bartolomeo Pinelli, Italian illustrator and engraver (died 1835)
 December 16 – Jean Broc, painter (died 1850)
 date unknown
 Nikolai Ivanovich Argunov, painter and academician of the St. Petersburg Academy of Arts (died 1829)
 John Heaviside Clark, Scottish aquatint engraver and painter of seascapes and landscapes (died 1863)
 Samuel Elmgren, Finnish painter (died 1834)
 John Eyre, Australian painter and engraver (died 1812)
 William Armfield Hobday, English portrait painter and miniaturist (died 1831)
 Thomas Richmond, English miniature-painter (died 1837)
 Kazimierz Wojniakowski, Polish painter (died 1812)

Deaths
March 8 – Louis August le Clerc, French-born sculptor (born 1688)
March 20 – Louis-Michel van Loo, French painter (born 1707)
April 14 – Laurent Cars, French designer and engraver (born 1699)
May 11 – Franz Edmund Weirotter, Austrian landscape painter (born 1733)
September 9 – Robert Wood, British engraver gentleman and politician (born 1717)
September 14 – Louis de Moni, Dutch genre painter (born 1698)
date unknown
John Baker, English flower painter (born 1726)
George Bickham the Younger,  English etcher, engraver, printseller, and one of the first English caricaturists (born 1706)
Jean Baptiste Claude Chatelain, French engraver (born 1710)
Charles Exshaw, Irish painter and engraver (born unknown)
Johan Georg Geitel, Finnish painter (born 1683)
Ding Guanpeng, Chinese painter in Qing Dynasty (date of birth unknown)
Giuseppe Marchesi, Italian painter active mainly in Bologna (born 1699)
Felice Polanzani, Italian engraver (born 1700)
Johann Preissler, German engraver (born 1698)
Andrea Soldi, Italian portrait painter working in London (born 1703)
probable – Anton Giuseppe Barbazza, Italian painter and engraver of the Baroque period (born 1720)

References

 
Years of the 18th century in art
1770s in art